Sitton may refer to:

Carl Sitton (1881–1931), Major League Baseball pitcher
Charlie Sitton (born 1962), retired American basketball player
Claude Sitton (1925–2015), American newspaper reporter, winner of the Pulitzer Prize for Commentary
John Sitton (born 1959), English former professional footballer, former manager of Leyton Orient
Josh Sitton (born 1986), American football offensive guard in the National Football League
Ray B. Sitton (1923–2013), American lieutenant general, command pilot and navigator
Ryan Sitton (born 1975), Texas politician
Ted Sitton (born 1932), former American football coach in the United States

See also
Sitton Gulch Creek, Georgia, USA
Sittaon, Burkina Faso
Sitton, Dean, California, USA